The Nova Scotian Institute of Science is a Canadian non-profit organization that promotes scientific research in Nova Scotia.

Founded in 1862 and incorporated by an act of the Nova Scotia House of Assembly in 1890, the Institute is one of the oldest learned societies in Canada, providing members and the public an opportunity to communicate about scientific research.

Monthly meetings are held at the Nova Scotia Museum of Natural History in addition to public lectures and panel discussions.  The Institute publishes the peer-reviewed journal The Proceedings of the Nova Scotian Institute of Science and has a library housed at the Killam Library on the Studley Campus of Dalhousie University.

External links
 Nova Scotian Institute of Science

Educational organizations based in Nova Scotia
Scientific organizations based in Canada